Conuber sordidum (originally described as Natica sordida by Swainson) is a species of predatory sea snail, a marine gastropod mollusk family Naticidae, the moon snails.

Distribution
East coast of Australia, from Victoria to Queensland. The species also occurs off Tasmania and New Zealand.

Life habits 
Conuber sordidum is predatory, feeding mostly on bivalves and gastropods. The species is also known to prey on the soldier crab Mictyris longicarpus by drilling predation. To catch soldier crabs, C. sordidum uses the same stereotyped behaviour as previously described for moon snails hunting shelled molluscan prey.

Habitat 
On intertidal muddy sand flats near mangroves or sea weed.

References

 Torigoe K. & Inaba A. (2011). Revision on the classification of Recent Naticidae. Bulletin of the Nishinomiya Shell Museum. 7: 133 + 15 pp., 4 pls

External links
 Quoy J.R.C. & Gaimard J.P. (1832-1835). Voyage de découvertes de l'"Astrolabe" exécuté par ordre du Roi, pendant les années 1826-1829, sous le commandement de M. J. Dumont d'Urville. Zoologie.
 Video of Conuber sordidus hunting Mictyris longicarpus on YouTube
 

Naticidae
Gastropods described in 1821